The BRW Rich 200, 2015 is the 32nd annual survey of the wealthiest people resident in Australia, published online by The Australian Financial Review in June 2015. 

In the 2015 list, the net worth of the wealthiest individual, Gina Rinehart, was 14.02 billion. 

The BRW Rich Families List was published annually between 2008 and 2015. In every year of its publication the Smorgon family headed the list, with estimated wealth of 2.74 billion in 2015 spread across seven branches of the family. In 2015 the list comprised fifty families with an entry point of 302 million. The families list was last published in 2015.

List of individuals 

{| class="wikitable"
!colspan="2"|Legend
|-
! Icon
! Description
|-
|
|Has not changed from the previous year's list
|-
|
|Has increased from the previous year's list
|-
|
|Has decreased from the previous year's list
|}

List of families

{| class="wikitable"
!colspan="2"|Legend
|-
! Icon
! Description
|-
|
|Has not changed from the previous year's list
|-
|
|Has increased from the previous year's list
|-
|
|Has decreased from the previous year's list
|}

See also
 Financial Review Rich List
 Forbes Asia list of Australians by net worth

References

External links 

2015 in Australia
2015